This is a list of monarchs who have abdicated. Some monarchs have been forced to abdicate. The list is chronological.

List

Gallery

See also
 Lists of monarchs who lost their thrones

Notes

References

Abdicated